Jane Crawford may refer to:
Jane Todd Crawford, patient from whom  Ephraim McDowell removed an ovarian tumour in 1809
Jane Freshfield (1814–1901), born Jane Quenton Crawford, English travel writer
Jane Crawford, a fictional character from the HBO television series Watchmen